Sedgwick Avenue is a major street in the Bronx, New York City.  It runs roughly parallel to Jerome Avenue, the Major Deegan Expressway, and University Avenue.  Sedgwick Avenue is one of the longest streets in the western part of the Bronx, running from Mosholu Parkway at the north to Macombs Dam Bridge at its southern end, about 800 feet (250 m) west of Yankee Stadium.

A smaller Sedgwick Avenue continues into Yonkers, north of Van Cortlandt Park and east of the Saw Mill River Parkway.

History
From the early 20th century until the 1970s, Sedgwick Avenue is one of the busiest thoroughfares in the Bronx, having streetcars, buses, and train stations.  In around 1900, it was a popular road for weekend bicycle tours and military marches to Van Cortlandt Park.

From 1918 to 1958, the Sedgwick Avenue elevated station operated at Webster Avenue.

New York City Mayor Bill de Blasio signed a bill on February 26, 2016 renaming 42 streets and places in New York City. One of the renamed blocks was a block where 1520 Sedgwick Ave is located which was renamed “Hip Hop Boulevard" after DJ Kool Herc who threw a "back to school jam " at 1520 Sedgwick Avenue, and at that party, hip-hop began. DJ Kool Herc had moved his parties to Cedar Park, "attracting b-boys and cool kids from across the Bronx [in] 1974."

Route description

The avenue starts as a northbound service road, running north–south, to Major Deegan Expressway (Interstate 87) at around the Macombs Dam Bridge. Morris Heights, Bronx is adjacent to this section of the avenue. It splits northeast and becomes two-way at around West Tremont Avenue;  Roberto Clemente State Park is at this intersection, and the University Woods, overlooking the Harlem River, a small wood land crested between Sedgwick and Cedar Avenues, is also nearby. Along this stretch, the Putnam Line had a station at Sedgwick Avenue. The NYPD's Strategic Response Group 2 stationhouse is located on Sedgwick Avenue at 169th Street. Sedgwick Avenue remains a primary thoroughfare through University Heights and Kingsbridge Heights; ZIP codes include 10463, 10467, and 10468.  The Sedgwick Avenue station was a train station on the abandoned section of the IRT Ninth Avenue Line from 1918 until 1958. The New York City Housing Authority has a number of large apartment complexes along the avenue. The avenue then turns east, and runs near the west and north sides of the Jerome Park Reservoir. Mosholu Parkway intersects with Sedgwick Avenue at its northern end.

There are buses and formerly streetcars along the avenue. Bus routes include .

This mostly two-way thoroughfare passes two historic sites:
 The Hall of Fame for Great Americans directly overlooks Sedgwick Avenue.
 DJ Kool Herc is credited with helping to start hip hop and rap music at a house concert at 1520 Sedgwick Avenue.

References

Streets in the Bronx